WiSA is a hardware and software standard for wirelessly transmitting digital audio from an audio source to wireless speakers. The standard is promoted by the Wireless Speaker and Audio Association (WiSA Association), which comprises consumer electronics manufacturers, retailers, and technology companies. The standard is based on technology from the WiSA Technologies corporation.

WiSA removes the need to run speaker wires or RCA cables between an AV receiver (or similar device) and speakers in a home theater or home audio setup. However, cabling isn't completely eliminated; powered speakers are required, so the speakers need to be connected to electrical outlets.

Technical specifications
 Maximum channels: 8
 Uncompressed audio
 Bit depth: Up to 24-bit
 Sample rate: Up to 96 kHz 
 Latency: 2.6 ms at 96 kHz, or 5.2 ms at 48 kHz
 Synchronization between speakers: ±2 µs
 Maximum supported room size: 30 ft x 30 ft
 Not designed to span multiple rooms.
 Transmission band: U-NII 5 GHz spectrum

WiSA doesn't mandate support for audio compression codecs. WiSA permits, but doesn't require, support for object-based surround sound schemes such as DTS:X or Dolby Atmos.

References

Wireless communication